Charles M. Thatcher (1844 – December 13, 1900) was an American soldier who fought in the American Civil War. Thatcher received his country's highest award for bravery during combat, the Medal of Honor. Thatcher's medal was won for his heroism in the Battle of the Crater in Virginia on July 30, 1864. He was honored with the award on July 31, 1896.

Thatcher was born in Coldwater, Michigan, and entered service in Grand Haven. He was buried in Kalkaska, Michigan.

Medal of Honor citation

See also
List of American Civil War Medal of Honor recipients: T–Z

References

1843 births
1900 deaths
American Civil War prisoners of war
American Civil War recipients of the Medal of Honor
People from Coldwater, Michigan
People of Michigan in the American Civil War
Union Army soldiers
United States Army Medal of Honor recipients
Date of birth unknown